Verblyud Island is an ice-covered island whose summit rises 200 m above the surrounding ice shelf, situated at the east margin of Lazarev Ice Shelf along the coast of Queen Maud Land. First mapped by the Soviet Antarctic Expedition (SovAE) in 1961 and named Kupol Verblyud (купол Верблюд - camel dome).

References 

Islands of Queen Maud Land
Princess Astrid Coast